Chandigarh Capitol Complex, located in the sector-1 of Chandigarh city in India, is a government compound designed by the architect Le Corbusier and is a UNESCO World Heritage Site. It is spread over an area of around 100 acres and is a prime manifestation of Chandigarh's architecture. It comprises three buildings: the Palace of Assembly or Legislative Assembly, Secretariat Building and the High Court plus four monuments (Open Hand Monument, Geometric Hill, Tower of Shadows and the Martyrs Monument) and a lake. It was added to the UNESCO World Heritage Site List in 2016 along with sixteen other works by Le Corbusier for its contribution to the development of modernist architecture.

See also
 List of World Heritage Sites in India
 Lists of World Heritage Sites
 Chandigarh capital region

References

Le Corbusier buildings in India
Government buildings completed in 1953
Tourist attractions in Chandigarh
Buildings and structures in Chandigarh
Government of Chandigarh
World Heritage Sites in India